The Goddard family were a prominent landed family chiefly living in the northern region of the English counties of Wiltshire and Hampshire and the western part of Berkshire, between the Tudor period and the early 20th century.

The Goddard family were established at manors in Upper Upham, near Aldbourne, and at Clyffe Pypard (both in Wiltshire) from at least the late 15th century. From 1563 until 1927, the family were lords of the manor of Swindon, living on the Goddard Estate at the house known as The Lawns. Other important manors included Ogbourne St George in Wiltshire, Standen at Hungerford in Berkshire and Stargroves at East Woodhay in Hampshire.

Wiltshire Goddards

Upper Upham 

The manor of Upper Upham, in Aldbourne parish south-east of Swindon, was held by Lacock Abbey from the 13th century until the dissolution, then in 1540 was purchased by John Goddard (died 1557). His grandson Richard (died 1614) built a substantial house there in 1599. The estate was sold by his descendants sometime before the early 18th century, but in 1870 was bought by A. L. Goddard (1819–1898); his son F. P. Goddard sold it in 1909. Upham House still stands, altered and extended in the early 20th century, and later divided into three dwellings.

The Lawns estate, Swindon

Thomas Goddard of Upham acquired the manor of Swindon in 1563 from the Crown. He later purchased the Crown Inn, renamed the Goddard Arms, which become Swindon's de facto Town Hall, Courthouse and Council rooms until the mid-19th century.

Thomas Goddard's purchase was said to include profits of the fairs and the weekly market, 60 messuages, 40 cottages, 2 water mills, 100 gardens, 100 orchards,  of land,  of meadows,  of heath,  of woods,  of pasture and one dovecote.

The estate included the area known today as the Lawns, and was bounded by the High Street and the site of Christchurch. The manor house was rebuilt around 1770; it is probable that this was on the site of a mediaeval building. It was known as Swindon House until 1850, and later as the Lawns.

The family home was a double-cube fronted building of brick with stone dressings and a baluster parapet. To the east of this was a five-bedroom dining block that looked out onto the gardens. When last occupied by the family, the Lawn had an outer and inner hall on the ground floor (giving access to a lobby and drawing room), a dining room with adjoining study, billiard room, library and gun room. There were two staircases leading to the various bedrooms, some with adjoining dressing rooms and also the nursery and servants' quarters.

The grounds included an arboretum, lawns, artificial lakes and ornamental gardens and was used for entertaining, garden parties and fêtes. During cold periods the frozen lakes were used by the family and local residents for ice skating.

The last of the male line, Major Fitzroy Pleydell Goddard, a diplomat, died in 1927. His widow, Eugenia Kathleen, left Swindon in 1931. Subsequent to this, the house remained empty until it was occupied by British and American forces during World War II. Damaged by the military, it was bought from The Crown by Swindon Corporation in 1947 for £16,000. The sale included  of land, the Manor house and the adjacent Holy Rood Church.

The house itself was derelict by 1952 and demolished. The Manor grounds were opened as parkland and remain so. Today; the wood, lake, sunken garden, elements of the walls and the gateposts at the entrance to Lawns are all open to the public. The site of the former stables are now the Planks auction house.

Lords of the manor of Swindon
Descendants of Thomas Goddard were Lords of the Manor until the 20th century. In the following list, descent is from father to son unless noted.

1563–1598 Thomas Goddard
1598–1614 Richard Goddard; the 1615 monument in Aldbourne parish church, with wife and four children, is probably his
1614–1641 Thomas Goddard; granted the right to hold markets and fairs in the town in 1626 from the King
1644–1650 Richard Goddard
1651–1683 Thomas Goddard (minor until 1669, with his mother as guardian until 1656 and Thomas Bowman until 1669)
1683–???? Thomas Goddard; converted one of the estate's alms houses into the town's first Market House in 1703
????–1732 Richard Goddard
1732–1742 Pleydell Goddard (brother of Richard Goddard)
1745–1754 Ambrose Goddard (cousin of Pleydell Goddard)
1757–1770 Thomas Goddard (eldest son of Ambrose Goddard)
1770–1815 Ambrose Goddard (youngest son of Ambrose Goddard); MP for Wiltshire 1772–1806; Director of the Wilts and Berks Canal, donated site for Christ Church
1852–1895 Ambrose Lethbridge Goddard (1819–1898); Deputy-Chairman of the Midland and South Western Junction Railway

1895–1927 Fitzroy Pleydell Goddard; Army Major and diplomat, High Sheriff of Wiltshire in 1907

MPs for Cricklade
Thomas Goddard (1777–1814) is recorded as being the Member of Parliament for Cricklade from 1806 to 1812.
Ambrose Goddard (1779–1854), 1837–41.
Ambrose Lethbridge Goddard (Lord of the Manor) 1847–68 and 1874–80 (serving alongside Sir Daniel Gooch)

Hampshire Goddards

The Goddard family owned the Stargroves estate at East Woodhay from 1565 until about 1830.

Berkshire Goddards

In the 1550s, Standen Manor in Hungerford was bought by John Goddard of Upper Upham House and it became one of the family's favourite homes. The family purchased Clyffe Pypard Manor in Wiltshire around the same time and divided their time between the two. They were associated with this county for about 150 years.

References

 
Swindon
English families
People from Wiltshire
People from West Berkshire District
People from Basingstoke and Deane